The following is a list of Gonzaga Bulldogs men's basketball head coaches. There have been 26 head coaches of the Bulldogs in their 115-season history.

Gonzaga's current head coach is Mark Few. He was hired as the Bulldogs' head coach in July 1999, replacing Dan Monson, who left to become the head coach at Minnesota.

References

Gonzaga

Gonzaga Bulldogs men's basketball coaches